Crouse Spur is a partly snow and rock spur descending from the east side of the Forrestal Range,  south of the Kester Peaks, in the Pensacola Mountains. It was mapped by United States Geological Survey from surveys and from U.S. Navy air photos, 1956–66, and was named by the Advisory Committee on Antarctic Names for Carl L. Crouse, a construction man with the Ellsworth Station winter party, 1957.

References 

Ridges of Queen Elizabeth Land